Penicillium mexicanum is a species of the genus Penicillium.

References

Further reading 

 

mexicanum
Fungi described in 2014